The Texas Governor's Unit Citation is the highest unit award of the Texas Military Forces. Subsequent awards are issued by a bronze or silver twig of four oak leaves with three acorns on the stem device.

Eligibility
The Governor's Unit Citation is issued to units and/or organizational detachments of the Texas Military Forces for:

 After 11 September 2001
 Extraordinary valor or exceptionally meritorious conduct or achievement in the performance of outstanding services
 For at least 90 continuous days in support of military operations
 While on active duty orders under Texas command (Title 32) or the United States Armed Forces (Title 10)
 Within the Continental United States (CONUS) or Outside the Continental United States (OCONUS)

Service(s), as used in this paragraph, is/are interpreted to relate to combat operations, combat support or service support operations or activities, not in State Active Duty status. The unit must have performed with marked distinction under difficult or hazardous conditions during single or successive operations covering the span of time of the recommendation.

Nomination for and award of unit campaign decorations or service medals for the same period and acts of service will not preclude recommendation and award of this decoration.

Authority

Awarding 
The Adjutant General of Texas is the awarding authority for this decoration. A general officer must present it.

Legal 
The Governor's Unit Citation was authorized and approved by the Adjutant General of Texas in May 1979 effective same date.

Description

Ribbon 
The citation is a moiré silk ribbon composed of a deep red stripe, 1/2 of an inch wide, in the center of the ribbon, with royal blue stripes, 3/8 of an inch wide, on either side, separated from the red stripe by 1/8 of inch wide white stripes. The ribbon is encompassed and encased by a gold frame imprinted with laurel leaves. The overall size of the award is 9/16 of an inch in height and 1 and 7/16 of an inch in length.

Device 
A bronze twig of four oak leaves with three acorns on the stem is issued to be worn to denote second and succeeding awards. A silver oak leaf cluster is issued to be worn in lieu of five bronze oak leaf clusters and is worn to the wearer's right of a bronze oak leaf cluster. Oak leaf clusters will be worn centered on the suspension ribbon and service ribbon with the stem, with the leaves pointing to the wearer's right. If four oak leaf clusters are worn on the suspension ribbon (on either the full size or miniature medal) the fourth one will be placed above the middle one in the row of three. Up to four oak leaf clusters will be worn side by side on the service ribbon.

Notable units

Notable recipients

See also 

 Awards and decorations of the Texas Military
 Awards and decorations of the Texas government
 Texas Military Forces
 Texas Military Department
 List of conflicts involving the Texas Military

References

Texas
Texas